Jan Edward Budkiewicz (19 May 1934 – 2 August 2022) was a Polish publicist, screenwriter, and politician. A member of the Democratic Left Alliance, he served in the Sejm from 1993 to 1997.

Budkiewicz died in Warsaw on 2 August 2022, at the age of 88.

References

1934 births
2022 deaths
Politicians from Warsaw
Democratic Left Alliance politicians
Members of the Polish Sejm 1993–1997
University of Warsaw alumni
Łódź Film School alumni
Polish screenwriters
Recipient of the Meritorious Activist of Culture badge